Heydar-Gholi Khan Ghiaï-Chamlou was an Iranian architect. He graduated from the École des Beaux-Arts in 1952, and was known as a pioneer of modern architecture in Iran. He designed the Senate House, the Royal Tehran Hilton Hotel, several train stations, cinemas, various civic and government buildings and the first series of state of the art hospitals. In France, he designed the Cité Universitaire aka Avicenne Foundation, amongst others.

In 1968, he was nominated architect to the imperial court of Iran and commissioned the vast project of a complex of imperial palaces situated in Farah Abad.
As a professor of architecture at the University of Tehran, he taught several generations of architects.

Heydar Ghiaï-Chamlou was born in Tehran on 23 October 1922, decisively settled in France later, where he died on 6 September 1985 in Cap d'Antibes.
The firm of Heydar Ghiaï & Associates has now been renamed Ghiaï Architects, based in San Francisco headed by his son Yves Ghiaï and his grand daughter Anahita Ghiaï.

Architectural philosophy

Quotes
 "Proportion is not a principle of architecture, but a principle of Life."
 "Man has a basic need for certain shapes, imparted to him by his civilization and corresponding to his immediate needs. In them he discovers himself."
 "I know a place where glass and concrete brush against the light, sparkling with delight."

Distinctions

List of projects
 Tehran Senate House
 Mashhad railway station
 Tabriz railway station 
 Avicenne Foundation
 Tehran Pars Drive-In Cinema
 Cinema Radio City
 Cinema Moulin Rouge
 Royal Tehran Hilton Hotel
 Farah Abad Palaces
 Mashhad Hospital
 Lavizan Hospital
 Ghiai Palace
 Various Private Villas

Artworks

Bibliography
 J.I Cohen, M. Eleb & A. Martinelli, "The 20th century Architecture & Urbanism"; Paris, A+U, 1990, pp. 146–51
 F. Ghiai, " Yady az Heydar Ghiai", Rahavard, No.26, No27, No28, No29, Los Angeles, 1990-91-92-93, pp. 246–52, pp. 233–40
 M. Ghiai, Iran Senate House, Max Gerard Edt. Draeger Paris, 1976 
 Architecture d'aujourd'hui, No.78, 1958, "Exposition et Hotel à Teheran", pp. 96–101
 Architecture d'aujourd'hui, No.84, 1959, Paris, "Palais des Arts à Teheran", pp. 16–17
 Architecture d'aujourd'hui, No.93, 1960, Paris, "Cinema en plein air à Teheran", pp. 20–21
 Architecture d'aujourd'hui, No.98, 1963, Paris, "Hôpital a Machad", pp. 33–34
 F. Bemont, "Teheran Contemporain", Art&Architecture, Teheran, No.17, 1973, pp. 85–88
 B. Oudin, Dictionnaire des Architectes, Paris, 1982, p. 187 
 H. Stierlin, Iran des Batisseurs, "2500 ans d'Architecture", Geneva, 1971, p. 102
 Michel Ragon Histoire de l'architecture et de l'urbanisme modernes, éd.Casterman, Paris, 1986 
 E. Yarshater, Encyclopædia Iranica, Volume X, New-York, 2001, p. 591-92
 R. Beny, "Iran elements of destiny", London, 1978, pp. 233, 265
 J.P. Roux, "Histoire des Turcs", Paris, 1984, pp. 253–54
 M. Akri, "Iran during the Pahlavi Era, Major political players", London, 1989, p. 392
 R. Ghirshman, Persia El reino immortal, London, 1971, p. 141
 Paris Match, "La Grandeur d'un Regne; le Senat Iranien", No.1448, Paris, 1977, p. 12
 Teheran Journal, "Downtown's Masterpiece", March 5, 1977, p. 6
 Architecture Méditerranéenne, No 46, "Résidence Royale", Marseille, 1995, pp. 195–97
 Architecture Méditerranéenne, No 51, "Maison Astrolabe", Marseille, 1998, pp. 230–31
 Architecture Méditerranéenne, No 52, "Chateau Golestan", Marseille, 1999, pp. 209–16
 Architecture Méditerranéenne, No 55, "From father to son, a dynasty of builders", Marseille, 2001, pp. 130–60
 Persian Heritage, No 19, "Like Father Like Son", New Jersey, 2000, p. 29
 Persian Heritage, No 21, "Interview with Farhad Ghiai", New Jersey, 2001, pp. 28–32
 Sun Coast Architect/Builder, Vol 58, No.6, "San Francisco Luxury Triplex", California, 1993, pp. 24–26
 Architectural Records, No.11, "Destination Architecture", New-York, 1998, pp. 110–11
 Kayhan, "Kakhe Golestan", London, Feb.24, 2000, p. 5
 Le Figaro, "Le Senat de Teheran", March 29, 1977, p. 28
 Jours de France, "Monde", June 21, 1965, p. 65
 Persian Heritage, " Mariette Ghiai, a leading Lady in Iran", Fariba Farhad, Vol.6, No.23, New Jersey, Fall 2001, p. 28
 teNeues, "San Francisco Houses", Loft Publications, Spain, Summer 2003, pp, 314-329
 California Masons, California, USA, Cover Story, March, 2004
 Diablo Publications, "The Palace Next Door", California, February 2004, p. 80
 Kayhan Newspaper, "Academic Medal for Yves Ghiai", London, May 13, 2003, p. 5
 Jean Royere "Decorateur a paris" page 40 p165 edition Norma

Notes

External links

 Steel Constructions
 Iran Chamber
 Ghiai Architects
 Ghiai History of the Khans of Ghiaī-Chamlou
 Emporis
 http://www.iranicaonline.org/articles/giai-haydar
https://www.lemonde.fr/m-le-mag/article/2019/04/09/la-cite-universitaire-de-paris-tour-de-babel-de-l-architecture_5447938_4500055.html
https://books.google.com/books?id=o6H1GwAACAAJ&dq=%22Heydar+Ghiai%22+-wikipedia&hl=en&ppis=_c&sa=X&ved=2ahUKEwi3zoWFrM_lAhUDP60KHeehAnAQ6AEwAHoECAAQAQ
https://books.google.com/books?id=6CGGTmGQh74C&pg=PA182&dq=%22Heydar+Ghiai%22+-wikipedia&hl=en&ppis=_c&sa=X&ved=2ahUKEwi3zoWFrM_lAhUDP60KHeehAnAQ6AEwA3oECAIQAg#v=onepage&q=%22Heydar%20Ghiai%22%20-wikipedia&f=false
https://books.google.com/books?id=XNnDCgAAQBAJ&pg=PA77&dq=%22Heydar+Ghiai%22+-wikipedia&hl=en&ppis=_c&sa=X&ved=2ahUKEwi3zoWFrM_lAhUDP60KHeehAnAQ6AEwBHoECAgQAg#v=onepage&q=%22Heydar%20Ghiai%22%20-wikipedia&f=false
https://www.researchgate.net/profile/Nicola_Ruggieri/publication/301550904_Archaeological_Heritage_Conservation_and_Safeguarding_During_the_18th_C/links/5718dbf708ae986b8b7b21e1/Archaeological-Heritage-Conservation-and-Safeguarding-During-the-18th-C.pdf

See also
 Senate of Iran
 Radio City Cinema (Tehran)

Academic staff of the University of Tehran
Iranian emigrants to France
1922 births
1985 deaths
École des Beaux-Arts alumni
20th-century French architects
20th-century Iranian architects